Corinna or Korinna is a female given name of ancient Greek origin, derived from κόρη (korē) meaning "girl, maiden". Other variants include Corina and Corinne.

People with the name 
 Corinna or Korinna, ancient Greek poet

Corinna 
 Corinna Adam or Ascherson (1937–2012), British journalist
 S. Corinna Bille (1912–1979), Swiss writer in French
 Corinna Boccacini (born 1985), Italian snowboarder
 Corinna Chamberlain (born 1982), New Zealand-Hong Kong singer and actress
 Corinne Cléry (born 1950), French actress
 Corinna Cortes, Danish computer scientist
 Corinna Dentoni (born 1989), Italian tennis player
 Corinna Everson (née Kneuer) (born 1958), American bodybuilder champion and actress
 Corinna Folkins (née MacDonald) (1918-1998), United States lawn bowler
Corinna Genest (born 1938), German film and television actress
 Corinna Halke (born 1957), German sports journalist and skater
 Corinna Harfouch (née Meffert) (born 1954), German actress
 Corinna Harney (born 1972), American model and actress
 Corinna Harrer (born 1991), German middle distance runner
 Corinna Hawkes, British professor of Food Policy
 Corinna Hein (née Biethan) (born 1983), German indoor cyclist
 Corinna Kennedy (born 1970), Canadian sprint canoer
 Corinna Kopf (born 1995 ), American YouTuber and gamer
Corinna Kunze (born 1963), German handball player
 Corinna E. Lathan, American entrepreneur
 Corinna Lawrence (born 1990), British épée fencer
 Corinna Lechner (born 1994), German racing cyclist
 Corinna Lin (born 1994), Taiwanese-American figure skater
 Corinna Lingnau (born 1960), German field hockey player
Corinna Löckenhoff, German psychologist and gerontologist
 Corinna Kuhnle (née 1987), Austrian slalom canoeist
 Corinna Martini (born 1985), German luger
 Corinna May (née Meyer) (born 1970), German singer
Corinna Miazga (1983–2023), German politician
 Corinna Mura (née Wall) (1910–1965), American cabaret singer, diseuse, and film actress
 Corinna von Rad (born 1971), German-American opera director
Corinna Rüffer (born 1975), German politician
 Corinna zu Sayn-Wittgenstein-Sayn (née Larsen) (born 1964), German philanthropist
 Corinna S. Schindler, University of Michigan faculty
Corinna Schnitt (born 1964), German filmmaker, artist, and professor
 Corinna Scholz (born 1989), German curler
 Corinna Schumacher, née Betsch (born 1969), German animal rights activist, wife of racing driver Michael Schumacher
Corinna Schwab (born 1999), German sprinter
 Corinna Shattuck (1848–1910), American educator and missionary in Turkey
 Corinna Putnam Smith (née Corinna Haven Putnam) (1876–1965), American writer, amateur archaeologist, scholar of Arabic
 Corinna Tsopei (born 1944), American Olympic judoka
 Corinna Ulcigrai (born 1980), Italian mathematician
Corinna West, American Olympic judoka
 Cori Zarek, media lawyer

Korinna 
 Korinna Fink (born 1981), German sprinter
 Korinna Ishimtseva (born 1984), Kazakhstani volleyball player
 Korinna Moon Bloodgood (born 1975), American actress and model

Pseudonyms 
Corinna, Ovid's (probably fictitious) lover in the Amores
Corinna, pen name of English poet Elizabeth Thomas (1675–1731)

Fictional characters 
 Corinna Chapman, series of mysteries written by Kerry Greenwood
 Corinna Schmidt, 1951 East German drama film 
 Beloved Corinna, 1956 German drama film
 Corinna Wiles, character in the 2007 TV series Drive
 "Corrine, Corrina", 1928 blues song

References

German feminine given names
English given names